Phryganodes unitalis is a moth in the family Crambidae. It was described by Achille Guenée in 1854. It is found in Bangladesh, mainland India and the Andaman Islands and Papua New Guinea.

References

Spilomelinae
Moths described in 1854